The 13-Storey Treehouse is a 2011 book written by author Andy Griffiths and illustrated by Terry Denton, and a stage play based on the book. The story follows Andy and Terry, who are living in a 13-storey treehouse, struggling to finish their book on time among many distractions and their friend Jill, who lives in a house full of animals and often visits them. According to the book, the 13-storey treehouse has "a bowling alley, a see-through swimming pool, a tank full of man-eating sharks, a secret underground laboratory, a vegetable vaporizer and a marshmallow machine that shoots marshmallows into your mouths when it sees that you are hungry".

The 13-Stoery Treehouse won the Australian Book Industry Awards Book of the Year for Older Children 2012 and the 2012 COOL Award for Fiction for Older Readers.

Plot
The book begins with the narrator and fictional depiction of the author, Andy Griffiths, giving an introduction to himself, his friend and illustrator Terry Denton, and their treehouse

Andy wakes up one morning, and on his way to getting breakfast, he meets Terry, painting a white cat yellow to turn it into a canary, or a "catnary". After being dropped from the treehouse, the cat grows wings and flies away. Andy and Terry are then greeted by their animal-loving friend Jill, who wants to find her pet cat, Silky. It turns out that the cat Terry painted was that exact cat. Andy and Terry try to remain innocent when Jill questions them. Right after Jill leaves, Andy and Terry receive a call via a 3D video phone by their publisher, Mr. Big Nose, who is upset that the duo is behind schedule.

They soon try to come up with ideas for a book, but Terry only has a few self-portraits of his finger. Since they're Terry's only pictures in his folder, he and Andy end up in an argument which starts a drawing competition. Once they compete for the best banana drawing, Andy gets upset and gets in a fight with Terry, armed with the Giant Banana Terry grew in the intro. Terry ends up knocking Andy out and pours a bucket of water to save him. They come back to ideas for their book, and it turns out that Andy has four pages that read "Once upon a time". But before anyone can say more, Terry gets distracted by television as his favorite show, Barky the Barking Dog, is airing. Andy is not amused at all and throws the TV out.

Right afterwards, the duo are greeted by Bill the Postman, who is giving them sea-monkeys that Terry ordered. Andy is very unhappy with this. Terry goes down to the Secret Underground Laboratory to hatch the sea monkeys. After Andy waits for a long time for him to come back, he goes down to the Secret Laboratory. Andy gets even more bored and angry while Terry finishes hatching a sea-monkey. He then starts feeding it, but it grows into a mermaid named Mermaidia whom the duo put in a bathtub. She and Terry grow attached, leaving Andy alone. He overhears the love conversation from the bath door, which ends in Terry kissing Mermaidia. Once Terry runs off, Andy enters the bathroom and finds out that Mermaidia was a sea monster in disguise. Andy records her singing a song about how disgusting she is. He runs down the stairs to find Terry, who is eating marshmallows. After being shown the proof that Mermaidia is a monster, Terry sides with Andy, and questions on what to do. They end up going to the underground laboratory so they can shrink her down with the banana enlarger.

……

However, Andy is still upset with how he and Terry haven't got their book done, but Terry suggests that they write what happened that day. They write the events up and with the help of Jill in a Santa-like sleigh, get their book to Mr Big Nose for it to be published.

The end.

Sequels
The book has spawned a series of sequels, each of them adding 13 stories to the treehouse:

 The 26-story Treehouse (released in September 2012)
 The 39-story Treehouse (released in September 2013)
 The 52-story Treehouse (released in September 2014)
 The 65-story Treehouse (released in August 2015)
 The 78-story Treehouse (released in August 2016)
 The 91-story Treehouse (released in August 2017)
 The 104-story Treehouse (released in July 2018)
 The 117-story Treehouse (released in July 2019)
 The 130-story Treehouse (released in October 2020) 
 The 143-story Treehouse (released in October 2021)
 The 156-story Treehouse (released in September 2022)
 The 169-story Treehouse (bound to release in 2023)
 Treehouse Tales
 The Treehouse Fun Book 1
 The Treehouse Fun Book 2
 The Treehouse Joke Book

References

Regular Occurrences 

 At the start of the second paragraph, Mr. Big Nose will call Andy and Terry to tell them the deadline of their next book as pointed out in the 39-story treehouse.
 At the end of each book, they will show the previous pages .
 The penguins are a frequent character appearing mostly for comedic affect.

Australian children's books
2011 Australian novels
2011 children's books
Written fiction presented as fact
COOL Award-winning works
Macmillan Publishers books